Haines Mill, also known as the Haines Mill Museum, is an historic grist mill located in South Whitehall Township, Lehigh County, Pennsylvania.

History and architectural features
The interior of this mill was rebuilt after a fire in 1908. A three-story brick addition was built in 1930, with a lean-to roof. A cupola sits atop the main roof. 

Haines Mill remained in full operation until 1957. Today, Haines Mill is operated as a partnership between the County of Lehigh, which owns and maintains the site, and the Lehigh County Historical Society, which provides public tours.

It was listed on the National Register of Historic Places in 1981.

Gallery

References

External links
Lehigh County Historical Society - Haines Mill and other Society museums

Grinding mills on the National Register of Historic Places in Pennsylvania
Industrial buildings completed in 1908
Museums in Lehigh County, Pennsylvania
Mill museums in Pennsylvania
Grinding mills in Pennsylvania
National Register of Historic Places in Lehigh County, Pennsylvania
1908 establishments in Pennsylvania